Mansoureh Ettehadieh is an Iranian historian and publisher. She obtained MA and PhD degrees from the University of Edinburgh in 1956 and 1979, respectively. Her PhD thesis was "Origin and development of political parties in Persia 1906-1911". From 1963 until her retirement in 2000, she taught in the History Department at Tehran University.

In 1983, she founded a publishing firm, Nashr-e Tarikh-e Iran, which focuses on the history of the Qajar period. In addition to many scholarly works, she has written two novels, Zindigi Bayad Kard and Zindigi Khali Nist. In 2000, she was also one of the founding members of the International Qajar Studies Association (IQSA).

References

Year of birth missing (living people)
20th-century Iranian historians
Iranian women novelists
Iranian novelists
Iranian publishers (people)
Alumni of the University of Edinburgh
Academic staff of the University of Tehran
Living people
Women historians